Subhoothipura Grama Niladhari Division is a  Grama Niladhari Division of the  Kaduwela Divisional Secretariat  of Colombo District  of Western Province, Sri Lanka .  It has Grama Niladhari Division Code 492.

Ministry of Internal Affairs, Wayamba Development and Cultural Affairs, Ministry of Social Empowerment, Welfare and Kandyan Heritage, National Audit Office (Sri Lanka), Department of Registration of Persons, Diyatha Uyana, Ministry of Agriculture (Sri Lanka), Battaramulla and Ministry of Lands and Parliamentary Reforms  are located within, nearby or associated with Subhoothipura.

Subhoothipura is a surrounded by the  Kotuwegoda, Battaramulla North, Kalapaluwawa, Rajamalwatta, Ethulkotte and Udumulla  Grama Niladhari Divisions.

Demographics

Ethnicity 

The Subhoothipura Grama Niladhari Division has  a Sinhalese majority (89.4%) . In comparison, the Kaduwela Divisional Secretariat (which contains the Subhoothipura Grama Niladhari Division) has  a Sinhalese majority (95.6%)

Religion 

The Subhoothipura Grama Niladhari Division has  a Buddhist majority (82.9%) . In comparison, the Kaduwela Divisional Secretariat (which contains the Subhoothipura Grama Niladhari Division) has  a Buddhist majority (90.4%)

Gallery

References 

Grama Niladhari Divisions of Kaduwela Divisional Secretariat